Violeta Lastakauskaitė (born 28 December 1965) is a Lithuanian rower. She competed in the women's coxless pair event at the 1992 Summer Olympics.

References

1965 births
Living people
Lithuanian female rowers
Olympic rowers of Lithuania
Rowers at the 1992 Summer Olympics